Times Books (previously the New York Times Book Company) is a publishing imprint owned by the New York Times Company and licensed to Henry Holt and Company.

Times Books began as the New York Times Book Company in 1969, when The New York Times Company purchased Quadrangle Books, a small publishing house in Chicago, founded in 1959 by Michael Braude. Its President was Melvin J. Brisk. Initially run entirely by The New York Times Company, the publishing arm name was changed to Times Books in 1977.

In 1984, the Times Company licensed the imprint to Random House. From 1991 through 1996, during the Random House tenure, the head of Times Books was Peter Osnos, who later founded Public Affairs Books.

Times Books was re-licensed in 2000 as an imprint of Henry Holt, which is itself an imprint of Holtzbrinck Publishers/Macmillan, the U.S. arm of the Georg von Holtzbrinck Publishing Group.

Editorial directors for Times Books have included David Sobel and Paul Golob.

Times Books has had a somewhat controversial right of first refusal policy  with respect to manuscripts by employees of The New York Times Company.

Times Books is headquartered at 120 Broadway in Manhattan, New York City.

References

External links
 Times Books
 Henry Holt and Company

1959 establishments in New York (state)
2000 establishments in New York City
Book publishing companies based in New York (state)
Publishing companies based in New York City
Publishing companies established in 1959
Publishing companies established in 2000
The New York Times